Qūmis (from ;), was a province in pre-Islamic Persia, lying between the southern Alborz chain watershed and the northern fringes of the Dasht-e Kavir desert. During the Sasanian period, it designated the area lying between the provinces of Ray and Gurgan and was part of the Padishkhwargar province.

Qumis became a province of medieval Islamic Persia. Its western boundaries lay in the eastern rural districts of Ray, while in the east it marched with Khurasan. It was bisected by the Great Khurasan Road, along which were situated the major cities of (from west to east) Khuwar (Choarene; modern Aradan), Semnan, Shahr-i Qumis (or "Hecatompylos"; the administrative capital; modern Damghan), and Bistam, while in its southeastern extremity lay the town of Biyar (modern Beyarjomand).

In 856, an earthquake centered in Qumis killed around 200,000 people. It was one of the deadliest earthquakes in recorded history.

There are remains of several Ismaili castles in the region (notably Gerdkuh), most of which were captured by the invading Mongols.

The name "Qumis" started to become obsolete from the beginning of the 11th century. Currently, the region is divided between the modern provinces of Mazandaran and Semnan.

References

 
Subdivisions of the Sasanian Empire
Former subdivisions of Iran
Historical regions of Iran
Subdivisions of the Abbasid Caliphate